Cardoni is an Italian surname. Notable people with the surname include:

Ben Cardoni (1920–1969), American baseball player
Ennio Cardoni (1929–2012), Italian footballer
Jeff Cardoni, American composer
Manuel Cardoni (born 1972), Luxembourgian footballer

Italian-language surnames